William G. Bainbridge (April 17, 1925 – November 29, 2008) was a United States Army soldier who served as the fifth Sergeant Major of the Army. He was sworn in on July 1, 1975, and served until June 1979. He was the last World War II veteran to hold the position of Sergeant Major of the Army.

Early life
Bainbridge was born in Galesburg, Illinois, on April 17, 1925.

Military career
Bainbridge entered the United States Army in June 1943 from Williamsfield, Illinois. His first unit of assignment was with the 423d Infantry Regiment of the 106th Infantry Division, the last army division organized for service in World War II. After deploying into the Ardennes region of Belgium in late 1944, Bainbridge's regiment was overrun by German forces during the Battle of the Bulge. He was captured and spent the remaining months of the war in a German prisoner of war camp before being liberated by the 6th Armored Division.

Upon returning to the United States, Bainbridge left active duty and joined the Army Reserve. He was recalled to active duty in January 1951. Following assignments at Camp Atterbury, Indiana, Fort Sheridan, Illinois, Fort Riley, and Fort Leonard Wood, he was reassigned to Europe and served as the Operations Sergeant with Headquarters, VII Corps. In 1962 he returned to Fort Riley, Kansas, where he served with the 1st Infantry Division as sergeant major of the 1st Battle Group, 28th Infantry, later reorganized as the 1st Battalion, 28th Infantry. In 1965 he accompanied the battalion to South Vietnam. Midway through his tour in Vietnam, Bainbridge was appointed command sergeant major of the II Field Force. 

From September 1966 through August 1967, Bainbridge was command sergeant major of the United States Army Infantry Training Center, Fort Benning, Georgia. He then was appointed the command sergeant major of the First United States Army at Fort George G. Meade, Maryland and later selected to serve as command sergeant major of the United States Army, Pacific located in Fort Shafter, Hawaii. In October 1972, Bainbridge became the first command sergeant major of the newly created United States Army Sergeants Major Academy at Fort Bliss, Texas and remained there until his appointment as Sergeant Major of the Army on 1 July 1975.

Later life

In July 1991, Bainbridge retired to Palm Bay, Florida. He died there on November 29, 2008, and was buried in Arlington National Cemetery.

Awards and decorations

 9 Service stripes.

References

The Sergeants Major of the Army,  Daniel K. Elder, Center of Military History, United States Army Washington, D.C. 2003.

External links
  William G. Bainbridge, In Memoriam

1925 births
2008 deaths
United States Army personnel of World War II
United States Army personnel of the Vietnam War
American prisoners of war in World War II
Recipients of the Legion of Merit
Recipients of the Distinguished Service Medal (US Army)
World War II prisoners of war held by Germany
People from Galesburg, Illinois
People from Palm Bay, Florida
Recipients of the Air Medal
Burials at Arlington National Cemetery
Sergeants Major of the Army
United States Army reservists